Ctenoplusia oxygramma (sharp stigma looper) is a moth of the family Noctuidae. It is found in southern Ontario, the eastern parts of the United States to Arizona. It has also been reported from Kansas, Nebraska, Iowa, Wisconsin, Mexico, the Antilles and from California south to Brazil and India Argentina.

The wingspan is about 35 mm.

Recorded food plants include Aster, Erigeron canadensis, Nicotiana tabacum  and Solidago.

External links
 Bug Guide
 Images

Plusiinae
Moths of North America
Moths described in 1832